The Emmbrook School is a co-educational secondary school located in Emmbrook, Wokingham, Berkshire, England, for students between 11 and 18 years of age. There are around 1,378 students at the school, with nearly 200 in the Sixth Form. The School is expanding in September 2021 by increasing their numbers joining Year 7

Between the 14 and 16 March 2017, the school was inspected by Ofsted, who rated it as "Good".

The school opened a new £2 million English block in 2015, a new Maths building was opened in 2017 and a new 3G pitch in 2020.

Previously a community school administered by Wokingham Borough Council, in April 2021 The Emmbrook School converted to academy status. The school is now sponsored by The Circle Trust.

The Houses
The four houses of the school are:

 Venus

 Jupiter

 Mercury

 Saturn

Students represent their house by wearing a tie in a corresponding colour. They compete in sporting events, including football, cricket, netball, rugby and rounders, as well as during sports day.
Other competitions contribute points to the house competition, including dance, music, and the merits collected by Key Stage Three pupils.

An E-Sports day was held on 25 February 2020 with representatives from each year group competing in a GoldenEye 007 tournament on the Nintendo 64 platform.

Between 2009 and 2019 the house names changed to Aqua (Blue), Atmos (Yellow), Terra (Green) and Solar (Red). This was reverted after a consultation with students, parents and staff.

Curriculum 
In Years 7, 8, and 9, children study a varied curriculum with a balance between the core subjects (English, maths, and science), humanities, languages, and creative subjects. In Years 10 and 11, all students study for qualifications in English, English literature, maths, and science, and can choose additional subjects. In Years 12 and 13, students can study a range of A-levels and BTECs.

Music Concerts 
The school holds regular concerts.

Tirabad
The Emmbrook School, along with Maiden Erlegh and Charters School, co-owns an outdoor education residential centre located in the Welsh village of Tirabad, Powys. Students from years 7-10 and the Sixth Form have the opportunity to spend a week at the centre once a year. The centre's activities are climbing, sailing, canoeing, caving, orienteering, environmental and field studies.

Sixth Form students from the three trust schools (Emmbrook, Maiden Erlegh, and Charters) jointly support the annual New Futures trip, in which students with disabilities travel to Tirabad. These volunteer students raise funds through charity work and then attend the trip to provide support for the younger children.

On 26 February 2021, a letter was sent to parents stating that Tyr Abad Residential Educational Trust was entering voluntary liquidation.

Headteachers 
There have been 6 Headteachers and 1 acting Headteacher during the school's lifetime

References

External links
The Emmbrook School website
School overview and profile from Schoolsfinder

Secondary schools in the Borough of Wokingham
Academies in the Borough of Wokingham